Liudmila Viktorovna "Luda" Belyakova (also transliterated Lyudmila Belyakova; born 12 August 1994) is a Russian ice hockey forward and member of the Russian national ice hockey team, currently playing in the Zhenskaya Hockey League (ZhHL) with HC Tornado. She is a 'Master of Sports of Russia of International Class,' as named by the Ministry of Sport of the Russian Federation in 2013.

A member of the New York Riveters during the 2015–16 NWHL season, Belyakova was the first Russian to play in the National Women's Hockey League (NWHL).

Playing career
Belyakova started playing ice hockey at age seven and played both forward and defense in her youth.

On 25 July 2015, it was announced that Belyakova had signed a one-year contract with the New York Riveters of the National Women's Hockey League. She joined the roster as one of three Riveters from outside of North America, alongside Janine Weber of the Austrian national team and goaltender Nana Fujimoto of Smile Japan. Belyakova ranked third on the team for scoring with ten points (5 goals+5 assists) in fifteen games played and scored one of the team's four playoff goals.

The Riveters opted not to sign her for the 2016–17 season, and it has been speculated that the language barrier was a major motivator behind the choice. As a free agent, Belyakova returned to Russia to play for her former club, Tornado Dmitrov, in the 2016–17 ZhHL season.

International play 
Belyakova was invited to join the Russian national under-18 ice hockey team when she was 12 years old and made her IIHF Women's World U18 Championship debut at the 2010 tournament. Belyakova was named the best player and best scorer of the 2011 IIHF Women's World U18 Championship – Division I. She also participated in the 2012 IIHF Women's World U18 Championship and was named a top-3 player on the Russian team by the coaches of the tournament. In total, she played 28 games for the Russian national U18 team, scoring 30 goals and making 11 assists.

Several weeks after turning 15, Belyakova was invited to join the Russian national team and her debut with the Russian senior national team quickly followed in a match against the Slovak women's national team in Trenčín on 4 September 2009. Representing Russia, she has participated at the IIHF Women's World Championship in 2012, 2013, 2015, 2016, and 2017. She was included in the list of candidates for the Russian national team at the 2010 Winter Olympics in Vancouver, though she was not selected to the squad. She was the first replacement for the Russian team at the 2014 Winter Olympics in Sochi.

As of 2017, Belyakova had played 131 international and showcase games with the Russian national team and had scored 51 goals and 38 assists.

In the women's ice hockey tournament at the 2018 Winter Olympics in Pyeongchang, Belyakova played with the Olympic Athletes from Russia team. She ranked second on the team for points, scoring a goal and two assists.

Career statistics

Regular season and playoffs 

Sources:

International

Sources:

Awards and achievements
Team promoted to Top Division, 2011 IIHF Women's World U18 Championship – Division I
Master of Sports of Russia of International Class, 2013
World Championship bronze medal, 2013 and 2016
Winter Universiade gold medal, 2015 and 2017
RWHL Champion, 2014–15
ZhHL Champion, 2016–17
Gratitude of the President of the Russian Federation, 2015 and 2017

References

External links

Official website 
Official website 

1994 births
Living people
Russian women's ice hockey forwards
Ice hockey people from Moscow
Shenzhen KRS Vanke Rays players
New York Riveters players
Russian expatriate ice hockey people
Russian expatriate sportspeople in the United States
Universiade medalists in ice hockey
Ice hockey players at the 2018 Winter Olympics
Olympic ice hockey players of Russia
Universiade gold medalists for Russia
Competitors at the 2015 Winter Universiade
Competitors at the 2017 Winter Universiade
HC Tornado players
Ice hockey players at the 2022 Winter Olympics